Hans Raj  is the deputy speaker of Himachal Pradesh Legislative Assembly and a leader of Bharatiya Janata Party . He was elected to the assembly from Churah in Chamba district. He was born on 2 April 1983 and studied BA, BEd, MA and M.Phil. He was first elected to the assembly in 2012.

References

1983 births
Himachal Pradesh MLAs 2017–2022
Living people
People from Chamba district
Deputy Speakers of the Himachal Pradesh Legislative Assembly
Himachal Pradesh MLAs 2012–2017
Bharatiya Janata Party politicians from Himachal Pradesh